The Gallagher Amendment was an amendment to the Colorado Constitution enacted in 1982 and repealed in 2020 concerning property tax.  It set forth the guidelines in the Colorado Constitution for determining the actual value of property and the valuation for assessment of such property.  The Gallagher Amendment was a legislative referendum drafted by Dennis J. Gallagher, then a state legislator. It was repealed in 2020.

Summary

The Gallagher Amendment made many significant changes to property taxes in Colorado:  

 It simplified the assessor’s methodology for determining the actual value of property.  Prior to this amendment, the assessor would consider some seven factors.  The Gallagher Amendment established just three: cost, market, and income. 
 It established that the actual value of residential real property would be determined by the cost and market approaches to appraisal only.
 It established that the actual value of agricultural land would be determined by the income approach to appraisal only (this is the earning or productive capacity of the land, capitalized at a rate prescribed by law).
 It provided immediate relief to the tax burden on various types of property by reducing the assessments rates for 1983 and 1984.
 It required the General Assembly to determine the percentage of the aggregate statewide valuation for assessment of various classes of property commencing January 1, 1985.  Specifically, the General Assembly would be required to adjust the assessment percentage for residential property to ensure that the percentage of the aggregate statewide valuation for residential property in relation to other taxable property would remain the same as that in the prior year, except for increased valuation for assessment attributable to new construction and to increased volume of mineral and oil and gas production.  This provision would become known as the Gallagher Adjustment.
 It exempted certain property from taxation.  These exemptions included: household furnishings and personal effects not used for the production of income; inventories of merchandise and material and supplies held for business consumption or for sale; livestock; agricultural and livestock products; and agricultural equipment used on a farm or ranch in the production of agricultural products.  Many of these classes of property had been considered a nuisance tax based upon the complexity of the valuation (and the time and resources which it required) and the marginal revenue produced by the tax.

The Gallagher Amendment had other effects as well, including mechanisms for enforcing the provisions described above.

Ballot title

Shall Sections 3 and 15 of Article X of the Colorado Constitution be amended in the following manner:

Election results
Passed by 551,334 votes (65.5%) to 290,590 votes (34.5%).

Repeal effort 

In 2020, due to state budget shortfalls, state legislators approved a ballot initiative to repeal the Gallagher Amendment. The changes in property tax rates the repeal would allow for greater funding of schools. The repeal was successful.

References

Colorado ballot measures
Colorado law
Constitution of Colorado